Keshav Dev Malaviya (11 August 1904–27 May 1981) was a leader of Indian National Congress and a union minister of India. He was a member of Lok Sabha from Domariyaganj, Uttar Pradesh. He received his degree in oil technology from HBTI Kanpur (now HBTU Kanpur). He served as a Minister of Petroleum in the 1970s in the Congress government. He is also known as the Father of the Indian Petroleum Industry.

Notes 
 
In honour of K.D. Malaviya, Dibrugarh University, Assam has established a chair for research purpose in the department of Applied Geology, with collaboration with Oil India Ltd. Duliajan in 1991. This chair is dedicated for research in the field of oil and natural gas.

References 

1981 deaths
1904 births
Lok Sabha members from Uttar Pradesh
Members of the Cabinet of India
India MPs 1952–1957
India MPs 1957–1962
India MPs 1962–1967
India MPs 1971–1977
People from Basti district
Petroleum and Natural Gas Ministers of India
Indian National Congress politicians from Uttar Pradesh